Carduus is a genus of flowering plants in the family Asteraceae, and the tribe Cardueae, one of two genera considered to be true thistles, the other being Cirsium. Plants of the genus are known commonly as plumeless thistles. They are native to Eurasia and Africa, and several are known elsewhere as introduced species. This genus is noted for its disproportionately high number of noxious weeds compared to other flowering plant genera.

Etymology
The genus name Carduus is from the Latin for "a kind of thistle" or "thistlelike plant". It is related to the word Cardonnacum ("a place of chardons or thistles"), which is the origin of Chardonnay, the name of the grape variety. It is also related to the word card, which as a noun means a device (often a stiff-bristled brush) for aligning and cleaning fibers, and as a verb means the action of processing fibers in that way.

Description
These are usually annual or biennial herbs, sometimes perennial. Species often grow 2 meters in height but are known to reach 4 meters. The erect stems are winged and spiny, and usually have woolly hairs. The leaf blades are hairy to hairless and entire or divided into lobes, and they have spine-toothed edges. The flower heads are solitary or borne in inflorescences of up to 20. The head is spherical to cylindrical and covered in several layers of spreading or curving spine-tipped phyllaries. It contains long, tubular disc florets in shades of white, pink, or purple. The fruit is a cypsela tipped with a pappus of barbed bristles or scales.

Ecology
Several Carduus are notorious invasive plants outside their native range, for example, in Australia and the United States. Species such as C. acanthoides, C. nutans, C. pycnocephalus, and C. tenuiflorus easily become weedy in disturbed habitat, such as overgrazed pasture. C. nutans is allelopathic, producing compounds that inhibit the growth and development of other plants.

Agents of biological pest control that have been used against weedy Carduus thistles include the thistle head weevil (Rhinocyllus conicus), thistle crown weevil (Trichosirocalus horridus), and thistle crown fly (Cheilosia corydon). The musk thistle rust (Puccinia carduorum), a fungus, may also be used against C. nutans.

Diversity

There are about 90 to 127 species in the genus.

Species include:
Carduus acanthocephalus
Carduus acanthoides – spiny plumeless thistle
Carduus acicularis
Carduus adpressus
Carduus affinis
Carduus afromontanus
Carduus amanus
Carduus angusticeps
Carduus arabicus
Carduus argentatus
Carduus argyroa
Carduus asturicus
Carduus aurosicus
Carduus axillaris
Carduus baeocephalus
Carduus ballii
Carduus bourgaei
Carduus bourgeanus
Carduus broteroi
Carduus budaianus
Carduus candicans
Carduus carduelis
Carduus carlinoides
Carduus carpetanus
Carduus cephalanthus
Carduus chevallieri
Carduus chrysacanthus
Carduus clavulatus
Carduus corymbosus
Carduus collinus
Carduus crispus – curly plumeless thistle, curled thistle, welted thistle
Carduus dahuricus
Carduus defloratus
Carduus edelbergii
Carduus euboicus
Carduus fallax
Carduus fasciculiflorus
Carduus fissurae
Carduus getulus
Carduus hamulosus
Carduus hazslinszkyanus
Carduus hohenackeri
Carduus ibicensis
Carduus jordanii
Carduus juratzkae
Carduus keniensis
Carduus kerneri
Carduus kirghisicus
Carduus knorringianus
Carduus kumaunensis
Carduus lanuginosus
Carduus leptacanthus
Carduus leptocladus
Carduus litigiosus
Carduus lobulatus
Carduus lusitanicus
Carduus macracanthus
Carduus macrocephalus
Carduus malyi
Carduus maroccanus
Carduus martinezii
Carduus membranaceus
Carduus meonanthus
Carduus millefolius
Carduus modestii
Carduus myriacanthus
Carduus nervosus 
Carduus nigrescens
Carduus nutans – musk thistle, nodding thistle
Carduus olympicus
Carduus personata
Carduus pycnocephalus – Italian thistle, Italian plumeless thistle, compact-headed thistle
Carduus ramosissimus
Carduus schimperi (may include C. platyphyllus and C. chamaecephalus) 
Carduus tenuiflorus – sheep thistle, shore thistle, slender thistle
Carduus textorisianus Marg.
Carduus uncinatus
Carduus weizensis
Hybrids
Carduus × aragonensis
Carduus × arvaticus
Carduus × camplonensis
Carduus × cantabricus
Carduus × cyrneus
Carduus × ipe
Carduus keniensis × C. platyphyllus
Carduus × leridanus
Carduus × orthocephalus

References

External links

Carduus.  In: Greuter, W. & E. von Raab-Straube. (Eds.) Compositae. Euro+Med Plantbase. 2006.
Carduus (a genus of thistles). BioImages: The Virtual Field-Guide (UK). Accessed 2013-02-17.

 
Asteraceae genera
Butterfly food plants
Taxa named by Carl Linnaeus